Yabulu is a town and coastal suburb in the City of Townsville, Queensland, Australia.

Geography 
The Bruce Highway passes through the suburb which fronts Halifax Bay.

Yabulu is the site of a major nickel and cobalt refinery, owned by Clive Palmer.

Cobarra is a neighbourhood near the nickel refinery.

There are two railway lines passing through the locality, the North Coast railway line and the now-closed Greenvale railway line. The locality has the following railway stations on the North Coast line

 Purono railway station
 Yabulu railway station()
and one at the nickel refinery from which processed ore was carried to the Port of Townsville via the North Coast line
Cobarra railway station

History 
Yabulu is situated in the traditional Wulgurukaba Aboriginal country, nearby Nyawigi Aboriginal country.

The town takes its name from Yabulu railway station. Yabulu is an Aboriginal word meaning grass. Nickel laterite mining at Greenvale led to the building of the Greenvale railway line to transport ore to a nickel refinery at Yabulu in the 1970s.

The most common responses for religion were Catholic 25.1%, No Religion 24.4% and Anglican 19.2%.

Palmer Nickel and Cobalt Refinery 
The Palmer Nickel and Cobalt Refinery is operated by Queensland Nickel, wholly owned by Clive Palmer. The Yabulu refinery became operational in 1974 after completion of the Greenvale to Yabulu railway line. Mining at Greenvale took place between 1974 and 1992 during which nickel laterite ore was transported to the Yabulu refinery by rail and processed up until 1993. Importation of ore from mines in New Caledonia, Indonesia, and the Philippines began in 1986 and continues to this day.

In 2009, Palmer bought Queensland Nickel and the Palmer Nickel and Cobalt Refinery. The following year, the company increased production by 30%, prompting him to give $10 million worth of Christmas bonuses to staff, including 55 Mercedes-Benz B-Class cars and overseas holidays.

World Wide Fund for Nature Australia (WWF) raised concerns that a tailings dam at the site could collapse during the wet season, posing an environmental threat to the Great Barrier Reef. WWF later retracted their comments, apologised and were forced to pay legal costs incurred by Palmer who sued WWF because of the comments. On 15 January 2016 the company terminated 237 workers. The leader of the opposition in Queensland supported the government's refusal to guarantee the loan on the grounds that it was not the proper role of government and that Palmer had used Queensland Nickel funds for his political party. On 18 January 2016 Queensland Nickel entered voluntary administration. It is expected the refinery will re-open sometime in late 2018/2019 if all current hurdles to restarting are overcome.

Amenities

Facilities located at Yabulu include a Caltex service station.

Attractions 
Bluewater Caravan Park is at 41420 Bruce Highway.

Purono Park
The suburb runs adjacent to Althaus Creek and is accessed via Purono Parkway, which runs north from the Bruce Highway.

The two main community facilities located in Purono Park are the Bluewater Medical Practice and the Bluewater Caravan Park.

See also 

 BHP Billiton Ravensthorpe Nickel Project
 Townsville Power Station

References

External links

 
 

Suburbs of Townsville